A square is a tool used for marking and referencing a 90° angle, though mitre squares are used for 45° angles. Squares see common use in woodworking, metalworking, construction and technical drawing. Some squares incorporate a scale for measuring distances (a ruler) or for calculating angles.

Terminology 
Many squares are made of two parts, a stock and a straight blade or tongue. The stock is usually thicker than the blade, with the blade being fixed into or onto the stock. The blade typically has parallel edges. The stock is usually held against the edge of a workpiece or drawing board and the tongue is then used as a straight edge for making a mark, or as a reference to check the accuracy of an angle.

History 

Wooden try squares have survived from Ancient Egypt and Ancient Rome and can be seen in art from the time. From the 18th century squares began to be manufactured in factories, prior to that they were typically made from wood and were often made by the tradesmen themselves. Some woodworkers continue to make their own squares.

Types of square 
There are a number of different types of square used for a variety of different industries and purposes:

Accuracy 

Different industries and applications have different requirements for the accuracy of squares. Some squares are manufactured to meet regulated standards of accuracy, such as British Standards BS 939:2007 for engineering squares, and BS 3322 for try squares.

A square can become inaccurate over time through common use and abuse, such as the edges becoming worn or the square being dropped or mistreated. The materials, most notably wood, can also vary with changes in temperature and humidity. Squares can be checked for accuracy against a known reference, such as a square or piece of machinery that is known to be accurate or against a cylindrical square. A bright light or feeler gauges can be used to check for gaps between the square and the object being referenced.

Through symmetry squares can also be checked against themselves. One method for L-shaped squares (illustrated) is to hold the square against a reliable known straight edge, a line is struck using a marking knife or sharp pencil, the square is then flipped over and from the same point another line is struck. If the square is accurate there should only be a single line visible.

There are a number of methods for correcting an inaccurate square by hand. For example, wooden blades can be corrected using a hand plane and sandpaper, while metal blades can be corrected using a file, emery cloth, or sandpaper. Framing squares can be adjusted using a hammer and a punch.

Symbolism 

The square is incorporated into the most common Freemasonry symbol, the Square and Compasses. Historically squares have also been used by woodworkers, such as joiners and carpenters, as symbols in signs and heraldry to represent their trade. The square as a symbol is also seen in artistic representations of the Christian saints Thomas the Apostle and James the Less.

References 

Woodworking measuring instruments
Metalworking measuring instruments
Dimensional instruments
Woodworking hand tools
Technical drawing tools
Squares (tool)